Claudia and David is a 1946 American comedy-drama film directed by Walter Lang. It stars Dorothy McGuire and Robert Young. Dorothy McGuire and Robert Young repeat their roles from the film Claudia (1943). Like its predecessor, Claudia and David was based on a series of short stories by Rose Franken, which also inspired a successful stage play and radio series.

Plot
Claudia (Dorothy McGuire), still charmingly naive and a bit nervous, is struggling with the responsibilities of marriage and parenthood in their rural Connecticut town. Jealousy creeps into the relationship when Elizabeth (Mary Astor) starts consulting David on a building project, while Claudia is attracting the uninvited attentions of Phil (John Sutton), who happens to be married.

Cast
 Dorothy McGuire as Claudia Naughton
 Robert Young as David Naughton
 Mary Astor as Elizabeth Van Doren
 John Sutton as Phil Dexter
 Gail Patrick as Julia Naughton
 Rose Hobart as Edith Dexter  
 Harry Davenport as Dr. Harry  
 Florence Bates as Nancy Riddle  
 Jerome Cowan as Brian O'Toole
 Frank Tweddell as Fritz
 Elsa Janssen as Bertha
 Anthony Sydes as Bobby
 Eva Novak as Maid

References

External links
 
 
 
 

1946 films
1946 comedy-drama films
20th Century Fox films
American black-and-white films
American comedy-drama films
American sequel films
Films about marriage
Films based on short fiction
Films directed by Walter Lang
Films scored by Cyril J. Mockridge
Films set in Connecticut
Films produced by William Perlberg
1940s English-language films
1940s American films